Plegma is a genus of minute, air-breathing land snails, terrestrial pulmonate gastropod mollusks in the family Helicarionidae.

Species
Species within the genus Plegma include:
 Plegma caelatura (Férussac, 1821)
 Plegma duponti (Morelet, 1866)

References

External links

Helicarionidae
Gastropods described in 1911